Susanna(h) Jones may refer to:

 Susannah Mushatt Jones (1899–2016), American supercentenarian
 Susannah Makeig-Jones (1881–1945), pottery designer
 Susanna Jones (born 1967), British writer

See also
 Susie Jones (disambiguation)
 Sue Jones (disambiguation)